Revd Edward Jones, DD (1653 – 10 June 1737), an Anglican clergyman from the late Stuart period until the Georgian era, was a long-serving Canon of Windsor (1684 – 1737).

Family
Dr Jones was the fourth son of Sir Thomas Jones, Chief Justice of the Common Pleas and Jane Bavand, daughter of Alderman Daniel Bavand, of Chester.

He married Katherine Fulham, daughter of Revd Dr Edward Fulham, and widow of Robert Waith, of Compton, Surrey (died 1720).

His daughter, Katherine Booth, had an only child, Katherine Tyrwhitt, from whom descend the present Barons Berners.

Career
Educated at Emmanuel College, Cambridge, Jones graduated BA in 1675, matriculating MA in 1678, before receiving a DD in 1720. He was elected a Fellow of his college from 1677 and taught at Cambridge until 1682.

Ordained on 29 May 1681 by the Bishop of London, following the appointment of Very Revd Dr Gregory Hascard as Dean of Windsor, he became Canon of the Third Stall of Windsor in 1684, which post he held until his death.

Canon Jones also served as:

Domestic Chaplain to Lord Guilford, until 1685
Rector of Hodnet, until 1702
Vicar of Brithdir, 1682 – 1705
Chancellor of the St David's Cathedral, 1713 – 1723
Chancellor of St Paul's Cathedral, 1723 – 1733.

See also
Baron Berners
Tyrwhitt baronets
Canons of Windsor

Notes

Further reading
Burke's Landed Gentry, JONES of Gwynfryn (1952 edn)

1653 births
1737 deaths
Clergy from Shropshire
Alumni of Emmanuel College, Cambridge
Fellows of Emmanuel College, Cambridge
Canons of Windsor
Chancellors of St Paul's Cathedral
18th-century English Anglican priests